Ñuñu Qullu (Aymara ñuñu breast, qullu mountain, "breast mountain", also spelled Ñuñu Kollu) is a  mountain in the Bolivian Andes. It is located in the Cochabamba Department, Tapacari Province. Ñuñu Qullu lies between Wila Apachita in the southeast and Janq'u Pukara in the northwest.

References 

Mountains of Cochabamba Department